The Riviera Theatre is a concert venue located on the north side of Chicago, Illinois, United States.

About

Built in 1917, it was designed by Rapp and Rapp for the Balaban & Katz theatre chain run by A. J. Balaban, his brother Barney Balaban and their partner and brother-in-law, Sam Katz. It is an example of French Renaissance Revival architecture. It later became a private nightclub in 1986. The theatre is located in the Uptown section of the city, at the intersection of Lawrence, Broadway and Racine. The area has several notable theaters, including the Aragon Ballroom, which is only 0.2 miles away. Since 2006 it has been owned by Chicago-based Jam Productions (itself owned by Jerry Mickelson and Arny Granat), which claims to be the "largest independent producer of live entertainment in the United States".

In October 2015 in a labor dispute, Jam Productions fired the stagehands of the Riviera Theater.

As of 2017, the Riviera Theater continues to serve as a venue for many popular acts, both local and national.

Notable events
My Life with the Thrill Kill Kult performed at the theatre October 28, 1988 and three tracks from the performance were released in 2004 as part of the reissue for their debut album. 
Jody Watley performed at the theatre July 21, 1989 during her Larger Than Life album tour.
Tin Machine performed at the theatre during their It's My Life Tour on December 12, 1991, which was recorded and became part of their live album, Tin Machine Live: Oy Vey, Baby. 
Groove metal band Pantera Filmed their music video for Walk at the theater in 1992 
The Smashing Pumpkins played a release party for their 1995 album Mellon Collie and the Infinite Sadness the night before its release here.
Type O Negative performed with Moonspell and Cradle of Filth November 22, 2003 for their Life Is Killing Me album tour.
Tame Impala performed at the theatre October 10, 2013 and the recordings were used for their live album Live Versions.
The venue served as the opening night on Miley Cyrus' Milky Milky Milk Tour which was a very limited tour with only 8 cities across North America. The show sold out within a few minutes with one fixed price of US$69.69.

References

External links
Official website

Music venues in Chicago
Movie palaces
Theatres completed in 1917